The History of the Siege of Lisbon is a novel by Portuguese author José Saramago, first published in 1989.

It tells the story of a proofreader and the story of the Siege of Lisbon as it both is and is not told in the book he is charged with correcting. It discusses many themes including language, history and historiography, and war in the medieval world.

In the novel Saramago challenges the common one-dimensional interpretations  of historical events that only focuses on kings and battles and ask for a more pluralistic perspective that include individual motives and behaviour and take account of the role of chance in shaping history.

Plot summary

Raimundo Silva, assigned to correct a book entitled The History of Siege of Lisbon by his publishing house, decides to alter the meaning of a crucial sentence by inserting the word "not" in the text, so that the book now claims that the Crusaders did not come to the aid of the Portuguese king in taking Lisbon from the Moors. This has repercussions both for himself and for the historical profession.  The second plot is Saramago's simultaneous recounting of the siege in the style of a historical romance.

The multilayered plot also include the love story between Raimundo Silva and his editorial supervisor Maria Sara and the middle-aged Silva's discovery of his imagination and ability to experience desire and passion. On other levels it is also a novel about the act of writing, the process of publishing and a comic commentary on recurring human foibles.

Critical reception
Kirkus Reviews described the novel as "A brilliantly amusing metafiction about the instability of history and the reality assumed by fiction" and called it Saramago's best work to date. "Saramago moves gracefully between the world of the reinvented past and the unheroic realm in which Raimundo's pleasing fantasies are constantly interrupted by hunger pangs and ringing telephones. The novel embraces a dauntingly broad range of references, juxtaposes past and present tense mischievously, and takes the form of elegantly convoluted long sentences and paragraphs—which, though they demand intense concentration, never descend to obscurity, thanks to Saramago's lucidity and wit"

Reviewing for The New York Times Edmund White wrote: "I found the verbal pierce and parry of the two proofreaders' courtship the most persuasive and vivid aspect of the novel. [...] The rest of the writing can sometimes seem to be nothing but digressions, although the author scatters plenty of clues that he fully intends his periphrases and divagations. At some point he tells us that a story can be 10 words long or 100 or 100,000 -- that every story, in fact, is infinitely extensible. He jokingly refers to his own long-windedness -- which differs from real pomposity in that it is never dull or humorless."

Attitude to the Reconquista

As noted by the Israeli reviewer Noam Levinhof  a major theme in the book is Saramago's appreciation of the Reconquista, a central element in the history of Portugal as well as Spain, of which the conquest or re-conquest of Lisbon by Christians and its transformation into the capital of Portugal is a key event.

The protagonist Silva, who can be assumed to at least partially represent Saramago himself in the matter, is very ambiguous in his attitude. On the one hand, he is Portuguese in nationality and - though not very religiousis part of many centuries of Portuguese Christian culture. He is well aware that but for the conquest of Lisbon, Portugal as we know it would never have come into being, and in one passage he states he would not have liked to find himself living "in a city of Moors".

On the other hand, as being a Lisbonian born and bred – and specifically, an inhabitant of Lisbon's Old City, which had been the Moorish city and stood the Christian siege – he is very much in sympathy with the Moorish people of Lisbon, who were attacked by what was for them an alien and cruel conquering army, who starved under the siege and were reduced to eating dogs (a point which is repeatedly referred to in the book) and were subjected to a massacre when the city finally fell.

One way of partially reconciling these two opposing attitudes is having the quite sympathetic Portuguese Christian warrior who takes a prominent part in the book bearing an Arabic name – implying that he was himself of Mozarab or Muslim ancestry, and in general that despite the bloody fighting between Christians and Muslims, there was a certain basic continuity of the people inhabiting the Portuguese territory, whatever their religion.

Levinhof compared Saramago's ambiguous attitude to the conquest of Muslim Lisbon and its transformation into a Christian city to the attitude of many Israelis to the conquest of Arab cities during the Israeli War of Independence in 1948.

References

1989 novels
20th-century Portuguese novels
Novels by José Saramago
Historical novels
Portuguese-language novels
Fiction set in the 1140s
Novels set in the Middle Ages
Novels set in Lisbon